Zayeltsovsky Park is a park in Zayeltsovsky District of Novosibirsk, Russia. It was created in 1932. The park is located in Zayeltsovsky Pine Forest.

It borders Ob River and Sukharka Microdistrict to the southwest.

Description

The park organizes fitness activities, skiing, holidays (Maslenitsa, Railway Day, etc.).

Various historical events are recreated in the park.

February 23, 2019, the final stage of the Complete Liberation of Leningrad from the Nazi Blockade was recreated.

In August and September 2019, several festivals dedicated to the Middle Ages were also organized.

The Territory of Siberia is an ethnic park within the Zayeltsovsky Park. It is dedicated to the indigenous peoples of Siberia. It hosts exhibitions, concerts of throat singing, national holidays etc.

The Small West Siberian Railway runs through the park and connects it with the Novosibirsk Zoo.

Paths connect the park with the Dendrological Park and the rest of the Zayeltsovsky Pine Forest.

Gallery

Bibliography

References

Zayeltsovsky City District, Novosibirsk
Parks in Russia
1932 establishments in Russia